The 2014–15 season was Barnsley's first season back in Football League One after being relegated the previous season.

Kit

|
|

Squad

Statistics

|-
|colspan=14|Players who have left the club

|}

Captains
As of 4 November 2014

Goalscoring record

Disciplinary record

Suspensions served

Contracts

Match details

Pre-season matches

League One

League table

Matches

FA Cup

The draw for the first round of the FA Cup was made on 27 October 2014.

League Cup

Football League Trophy

Transfers

In

Loans in

Out

Loans out

Overall summary

Summary

Score overview

References

2014-15
2014–15 Football League One by team